State Route 90 (SR-90) is a state highway in the U.S. state of Utah that sits completely within Brigham City in Box Elder County. The route travels from its western terminus at SR-13 to its eastern terminus at the junction of US-89/US-91.

SR-90 was the old routing of US-89/US-91 through the city before it was re-routed to a path bypassing the town.

Route description
SR-90 begins in the center of Brigham City and heads east through the east-central portion of the town. After continuing east for six blocks, the highway veers to the southeast to meet with US-89/US-91 at the mouth of Brigham Canyon, where SR-90 traffic is diverted to US-89/US-91 northbound through a flyover ramp.

History
200 South in Brigham City was added to the state highway system in 1910, and in the 1920s it became part of SR-1 (US-91). A proposed connection from proposed I-15 southwest of Brigham City east and northeast to SR-1 east of Brigham City was numbered State Route 85 in 1960, and in 1962, when SR-1 was moved to I-15, SR-85 was extended along former SR-1 to Idaho. 200 South, which was bypassed by the construction of SR-85 in about 1971, remained as a spur of SR-85 until 1975, when it was renumbered SR-90.

Major intersections

References

090
Utah State Route 090
Utah State Route 090
 090
Streets in Utah